CFFM-FM is a Canadian radio station broadcasting at 97.5 FM in Williams Lake, British Columbia, with an active rock format as The Goat. The station also rebroadcasts at 94.9 FM in Quesnel and at 99.7 FM in 100 Mile House.

CFFM-FM is owned by Vista Broadcast Group.

History
The station was approved by CRTC in 1986 and was launched in 1987 as CFFM-FM originally with a country format, over the years the station went through different ownerships and music formats. In July 2014, The station became known as 97.5 The Goat with an active rock format.

Transmitters

External links
 The GOAT Rocks
 CFFM history - Canadian Communications Foundation
 

Ffm
Ffm
Ffm
Radio stations established in 1986
1986 establishments in British Columbia